Jesse Kurki-Suonio (born 3 September 1990), more commonly known as Jesse Krohn, is a Finnish professional racing driver, and BMW Motorsport works driver.

He is notable for winning the Finnish, Northern European Zone (NEZ) and Estonian Formula Renault championships.

Krohn comes from a motorsport central family, with his father, Pertti, competing in the 1987 Finnish Formula Ford championship alongside 1998 and 1999 Formula One world champion Mika Häkkinen whilst his sister, Jenni, and brother, Oskari also compete in motorsport professionally in Finland.

Personal and early life
Jesse Krohn was born in Nurmijärvi, located in the southern Uusimaa region of Finland, during September 1990. His father, Pertti Kurki-Suonio was a racing driver, who competed in the Finnish Formula Ford championship alongside future Formula One drivers Mika Häkkinen and Mika Salo. However, despite finishing behind Salo and Häkkinen in the championship, Pertti's career never went beyond Scandinavia, excluding a one-off appearance at Brands Hatch for the Formula Ford festival.

His elder sister, Jenni, and younger brother, Oskari, are also both racing drivers both currently racing in their native Finland.

Racing career
Krohn began his career in karts when he was six, he spent nine years karting before moving up into car racing in 2005 as a test driver for saloon cars. In 2006, he competed in a number of Formula Ford events in his home country, finishing in eighth, and also competing in the Ford Ford Festival at Brands Hatch, finishing 10th, and also in the British Formula Ford Winter Series, finishing as runner up to Brit David Mayes. The Finn entered the full UK championship the following year as well as the Finnish Formula Three championship, "I was in a '97 Dallara with a H-pattern gearbox" Krohn recalls, "my shoulders were over the cockpit". In the UK championship, Krohn finished the year in 17th with 82 points whilst he had a better time in Finnish Formula Three with six wins and finishing second overall in the championship. He also re-entered the Formula Ford festival as well, performing better than the previous year finishing eighth.

2008 was Krohn's best year yet, with three championship wins in the Finnish, Northern European Zone (NEZ) and Estonian Formula Renault championships, recording ten wins in total. He also competed in the British, Italian and Northern European championships as well, but experiencing little success by comparison. With a number of successes the previous year, Krohn entered the UK Formula Renault championship for the whole season where he has so far tallied 117 points, including a win at Thruxton.

Krohn gained some notoriety during the year as well after climbing up from twenty–fifth to seventh in the wet conditions at Donington Park but soon dropped out of the point after his suspension failed and so had to complete the final three laps on three wheels, "exactly what Jan Magnussen would have done" commented Mark Burdett Motorsport engineer Andy Miller, who ran the Danish driver during his 1994 British Formula 3 campaign.

2014 saw Krohn admitted into the BMW Motorsport Junior Programme in which he trained in for three years, with established works drivers like Dirk Adorf and Jörg Müller. He won the 2017–18 Asian Le Mans Series GT Drivers title with Jun San Chen in the FIST-Team AAI BMW M6 GT3, and was promoted to BMW works driver in 2018.

Racing record

IMSA SportsCar Championship series results

* Season still in progress.

Complete 24 Hours of Daytona results

Complete FIA World Endurance Championship results
(key) (Races in bold indicate pole position; races in italics indicate fastest lap)

Complete 24 Hours of Le Mans results

References

External links
 Official website
 Krohn's entry at Driver Database

1990 births
Living people
People from Nurmijärvi
Finnish racing drivers
Formula Ford drivers
Formula Renault 2.0 NEC drivers
British Formula Renault 2.0 drivers
Italian Formula Renault 2.0 drivers
Finland Formula Renault 2.0 drivers
Sweden Formula Renault 2.0 drivers
German Formula Three Championship drivers
Formula Renault 2.0 NEZ drivers
Italian Formula Three Championship drivers
ADAC GT Masters drivers
European Le Mans Series drivers
24 Hours of Daytona drivers
WeatherTech SportsCar Championship drivers
24 Hours of Le Mans drivers
Sportspeople from Uusimaa
International GT Open drivers
Rahal Letterman Lanigan Racing drivers
Asian Le Mans Series drivers
BMW M drivers
CRS Racing drivers
Rowe Racing drivers
RP Motorsport drivers
Euroformula Open Championship drivers
Mark Burdett Motorsport drivers
Nürburgring 24 Hours drivers